Vijay Ratnakar Gutte is an Indian film director and producer. He is the son of MLA Ratnakar Gutte from Gangakhed constituency of Maharashtra Legislative Assembly. He is known for his film The Accidental Prime Minister starring Anupam Kher and Akshaye Khanna. The film was based on the on Book written by Sanjaya Baru. He also produced film Badmashiyaan, The Film Emotional Atyachar, and Time Bara Vait.

Filmography

References

Indian film directors
Indian film producers
Year of birth missing (living people)
Living people